Brian Harold McDonald (born March 23, 1945) is a Canadian former professional ice hockey centre.

Career 
McDonald played 20 games in the National Hockey League: 8 playoff games with the Chicago Black Hawks during the 1967–68 season and 12 during the 1970–71 regular season with the Buffalo Sabres. He also played in the World Hockey Association with the Houston Aeros, Los Angeles Sharks, Michigan Stags, and Indianapolis Racers between 1972 and 1977.

Career statistics

Regular season and playoffs

External links
 

1945 births
Living people
Buffalo Bisons (AHL) players
Buffalo Sabres players
Canadian ice hockey centres
Chicago Blackhawks players
Dallas Black Hawks players
Denver Spurs (WHL) players
Houston Aeros (WHA) players
Indianapolis Racers players
Los Angeles Sharks players
Michigan Stags players
Mohawk Valley Comets (NAHL) players
Salt Lake Golden Eagles (WHL) players
San Diego Gulls (WHL) players
St. Catharines Black Hawks players
St. Louis Braves players
Ice hockey people from Toronto